Jopala Municipality is a municipality in Puebla in south-eastern Mexico.

Regidor Guadalupe González Saíno (30), from Jopala was murdered with three shots on May 4, 2017.

References

Municipalities of Puebla